Men is a 1997 indie drama film written and directed  by Zoe Clarke-Williams and starring Sean Young.

Plot

Thirty-something chef Stella James lives a rather empty life in New York City with her alcoholic friend Teo, a former lover of hers who is now impotent due to his heavy drinking. Because of this Stella has numerous flings with random men, all of them have different personalities and come from different social economic backgrounds. One day Teo gives her plane ticket to Los Angeles to live without him and give herself a fresh start in a new city. There she gets work in a restaurant run by George Babbington and falls in love with younger photographer Frank.

Cast

  Sean Young as Stella James
  John Heard as George Babbington
  Dylan Walsh as Teo Morrison 
  Karen Black as Alex
  Richard Hillman as Frank 
  Beau Starr as Tony, wine taster
  Glenn Shadix as Neil, poster
  Shawnee Smith as Clara
  Kenneth Moskow as Mr. Ehreheart 
   Annie Fitzgerald as Mrs. Ehreheart
  Paul Williams as Homeless Man  
   Annie McEnroe as Annie

References

External links

1997 drama films
1997 films
American drama films
1990s English-language films
1990s American films